Csaba Gaspar (born 27 July 1955) is an Argentine fencer. He competed in the foil and épée events at the 1984 Summer Olympics.

References

External links
 

1955 births
Living people
Argentine male fencers
Argentine épée fencers
Argentine foil fencers
Olympic fencers of Argentina
Fencers at the 1984 Summer Olympics
Pan American Games medalists in fencing
20th-century Argentine people
Fencers at the 1979 Pan American Games
Medalists at the 1979 Pan American Games
Pan American Games bronze medalists for Argentina